iParenting Media was a company and then a unit of Disney Online that operated web sites, provided apps, and gave widely recognized prizes for content related to children and parenting. It was a separate company prior to the Disney acquisition. The company was started in January 1997 by Elisa Ast All and Alvin All and was sold in December 2007. The former was pregnant at the time of founding.

Sites
 PregnancyToday.com
 Preconception.com
 Cycle Daily
 Celebrity Parents
 Pregnancy Today
 Pregnancy Daily
 Birth Plan
 Birthstories
 Babies Today
 Baby Daily
 Breastfeed.com
 Toddlers Today
 Preschoolers Today
 Children Today
 Preteenagers Today
 Teenagers Today
 Dads Today
 Moms Today
 Grandparents Today
 Recipes Today
 Home Style Today
 Traveling Today
 Twins Today
 Special Kids Today
 iParenting Adoption
 iParenting Stories

Content
iParenting Media produced podcasts from 2006 to 2009.

Awards
iParenting Media Awards have been granted in these categories
 Accessories
 Audio
 Baby Care
 Bedding
 Book
 Clothing
 Cribs
 Feature Film
 Feeding
 Food
 Gear and Equipment
 Gifts
 Home Video/DVD
 Housewares
 Just for Dad
 Just for Mom
 Magazines
 Safety
 Software
 Sporting Goods
 Storyteller
 Television
 Toys & Games
 Video Game
 Websites

References

Companies based in Evanston, Illinois
American companies established in 1999
The Walt Disney Company